The 1984 San Francisco State Gators football team represented San Francisco State University as a member of the Northern California Athletic Conference (NCAC) during the 1983 NCAA Division II football season. Led by 24th-year head coach Vic Rowen, San Francisco State finished the season with an overall record of 4–5–1 and a mark of 2–3–1 in conference play, tying for fourth place in the NCAC. For the season the team was outscored by its opponents was outscored by 240 to 209. The Gators played home games at Cox Stadium in San Francisco.

With the three forfeits, the Gators' 1984 record fell to 1–8–1 overall and 1–4–1 in conference play, dropping them to sixth place in the NCAC.

Schedule

References

San Francisco State
San Francisco State Gators football seasons
San Francisco State Gators football